"Hush" is a song written by American composer and musician Joe South, for recording artist Billy Joe Royal. The song was later covered by Somebody's Image (an Australian band fronted by Russell Morris) in 1967. It reached #15. It was also covered by Deep Purple in 1968 and by Kula Shaker in 1997. Each artist had a Top 5 hit with their version.

Billy Joe Royal version
Billy Joe Royal recorded "Hush" on 12 July 1967 in Nashville with Barry Bailey, future lead guitarist for the Atlanta Rhythm Section, on guitar. Joe South, Royal's regular songwriter/producer, was travelling to Nashville with Royal and writing "Rose Garden" in the car. Royal didn't like it, so South wrote "Hush" for him while leaning on the dashboard. Royal did record "Rose Garden" for his album Billy Joe Royal featuring Hush, though didn't release it as a single. In 1971, "Rose Garden" become an international hit for Lynn Anderson, and was South's most successful composition. Royal later regretted not liking the song.

Although more successful than Royal's last six single releases, only two of which had ranked even low on the Billboard Hot 100, "Hush" would not afford Royal a Top 40 comeback: managing only one "top-tier" market breakout in Chicago - whose prime Top 40 station WLS would rank "Hush" as high as #5 tying the WLS hit parade peak for both Royal's 1965 career record "Down in the Boondocks" and also Deep Purple's 1968 "Hush" cover - "Hush" would rise no higher on the Hot 100 than #52, with a Canadian pop chart peak of #45. The qualified success of "Hush" was sufficient to allow for the release of Royal's second album Billy Joe Royal featuring Hush.

"Hush" did afford Billy Joe Royal a one-off hit on the European continent, reaching #12 on the German singles chart and becoming a Top Ten hit in Belgium (#1), the Netherlands (#5) and Switzerland (#2).

A promo clip for Billy Joe Royal's release of the song was filmed at the boardwalk amusement park and outskirts of an unidentified Southern beach town.

Deep Purple version

The song was subsequently recorded by British hard rock band  Deep Purple  for their 1968 debut album Shades of Deep Purple, group member Ritchie Blackmore having heard the Billy Joe Royal original while living in Hamburg: (Ritchie Blackmore quote:) "It was a great song [which] would be a good song [for] our act, if we could come up with a different arrangement...We [recorded] the whole song in two takes." The track became the group's first hit single peaking at number 4 on the Hot 100 on 21–28 September 1968, number 16 in Italy in late 1968, and number 2 in Canada while going largely unnoticed in the United Kingdom.  Cash Box called it a  "psychedelicized reversion of the time-back Billy Joe Royal song," saying that the instrumental work and tailoring of the rock song all point to sheer force". 

In 1968, Deep Purple performed live on Hugh Hefner's Playboy After Dark TV series. The band opened the episode playing the instrumental "And the Address". After Hefner heard a ghost story from Jon Lord and had a guitar lesson from Ritchie Blackmore, Deep Purple performed "Hush" which is available in the Playboy After Dark -2nd Collection 2007 DVD release and the 2000 CD-reissue of the Shades of Deep Purple album.

In celebration of the band's 20th anniversary, Deep Purple re-recorded the song in 1988 for their album Nobody's Perfect. The track was released as a single and reached number 62 on the UK singles chart and number 44 on the US Hot Mainstream Rock chart.

"Hush" is one of four songs originally recorded with the band's original vocalist Rod Evans and bassist Nick Simper that Deep Purple have performed with their replacements Ian Gillan and Roger Glover later on. Others are "Mandrake Root", also from Shades of Deep Purple, "Kentucky Woman", from the album The Book of Taliesyn from 1968 and "Bird Has Flown", from the album Deep Purple from 1969. The instrumental "Wring That Neck" from The Book of Taliesyn was also a regular part of the band's setlist into the early 1970s.

Other versions
The song's composer Joe South  recorded "Hush" in 1968 for his second album Games People Play. 
 British singer Kris Ife released a version in December 1967 (MGM Records single)
Tommy Körberg recorded "Hush" for his 1968 album Nature Boy, credited to Tom.
Merrilee Rush recorded "Hush" for her 1968 album Angel of the Morning.
Love Affair recorded "Hush" for their 1968 album The Everlasting Love Affair.
A 1973 single release of "Hush" by Jeannie C. Riley, from her album Just Jeannie, reached #51 on the Billboard C&W chart.
Swiss band Gotthard included a cover on their self-titled 1992 debut album. They also performed the song live with Deep Purple's Jon Lord as guest special at the Zermatt Unplugged Festival in 2008. 
Jenny Rock, a Canadian artist, recorded a French adaptation version in 1970 entitled Mal (produced by Michel Pagliaro).
Kula Shaker recorded a version which peaked at No.2 in the UK Charts in 1997 and was used on the soundtrack for I Know What You Did Last Summer and the marketing for Kingsman: The Secret Service. 
Somebody's Image recorded a version that was a minor hit in Australia in 1967.
The Partridge Family performed a version on their TV series, with David Cassidy on vocals.
Milli Vanilli recorded a version on their debut album All or Nothing in 1988.
Complex recorded a version for their debut self-titled studio album in 1970.
Funky Junction recorded a version of "Hush" on their only album Funky Junction Play a Tribute to Deep Purple in 1973. The band featured Phil Lynott, Eric Bell, and Brian Downey from Thin Lizzy.
Captain Jack covered "Hush" on the Eurodance album Party Warriors, released in Europe in 2003.

Personnel

1968 Deep Purple version
Ritchie Blackmore – guitar
Rod Evans – lead vocals
Nick Simper – bass guitar, backing vocals
Ian Paice – drums
Jon Lord – Hammond organ, backing vocals

1988 Deep Purple version
Ritchie Blackmore – guitar
Ian Gillan – vocals, harmonica
Roger Glover – bass
Ian Paice – drums
Jon Lord – organ, keyboards

References

Billy Joe Royal songs
Deep Purple songs
Kula Shaker songs
Songs written by Joe South
1967 singles
1968 debut singles
1980 singles
1988 singles
Columbia Records singles
Parlophone singles
Mercury Records singles
Polydor Records singles
1967 songs